Rome Sentinel is a family-owned upstate New York newspaper that, for generations, has been sourcing national and international news via cooperation with competitors. In the late 1940s they founded a local radio station, WRUN

History
The newspaper's roots in the early 1800s included use of the names Rome Telegraph, and Democratic Sentinel, (with the same publisher). The paper did not become Rome Sentinel (including Rome Weekly Sentinel and Rome Daily Sentinel)
 until 1840. Their coverage includes topics
such as nuclear weapons, and The New York Times cited their "Deep, Dignified and Effective" article, among others.
 Their editorials drew comments from competitors, who at times cite some of their scoops, some of which are distributed by Associated Press.

References

Daily newspapers published in New York (state)